Masthikatte is a village located in Hosanagara Taluk, Shimoga district, Karnataka, India.pincode 577425

Etymology
In local tradition, Masthikatte means "a place where woman (may be widow) sacrifised herself"
or a place where suttee or Sati was practiced. Masthi means "Maha Sati" or revered lady. There is a spot near three road junction which is identified as "Masthikatte".

Activity
Masthikatte came into existence in the 1980s when the Karnataka Power Corporation built a township for its employees working on the Varahi Hydroelectric Project. It can be called a gated community, surrounded by the thick forests of the Western Ghats. The town has a number of amenities, including a post office, bank, and medical facilities which were all provided by the Karnataka Power Corporation.

Transportation
Masthikatte is well connected to the towns of Shimoga, Hosanagara, Thirthahalli, Kundapura, Udupi and Mangalore on the State Highway.

Rainfall
Masthikatte receives heavy rainfall and receives equal amount or more rainfall (in some seasons) than Agumbe,  which has record of heaviest rain fall in Karnataka.

Flora and fauna
As the village is located in the midst of dense forests belonging to Western Ghats, a World Heritage Site, variety of flora and fauna occur around Masthikatte.

Places of interest

Varahi Backwaters
Backwaters of the Varahi River dam exist in the low-lying areas some 3 kilometers away, near the village of Hulikal

Kunchikal Falls
The Kunchikal Falls in the Western Ghats area, created by Varahi River, are located 5 Kilometers away from Masthikatte. At 1,493 feet,(455 metres) the falls are dubbed as Highest in India. Damming at Mani for the Hydroelectric plant has greatly reduced the flow of the waterfalls, however.

Chandikamba Temple, Hulikal
Deep inside the forest, on state highway, small temple complex belonging to Chandikamba Temple is located at a distance of 5 km from Masthikatte.

See also
Kunchikal Falls
Varahi River
Agumbe

References

Villages in Shimoga district